Catch a Fire is a 1973 album by Bob Marley and the Wailers.

Catch a Fire may also refer to:
Catch a Fire (film), by Phillip Noyce (2006)
Catch a Fire (That Petrol Emotion EP) (1993)
"Catch a Fire" (song), a song by Haddaway

See also
Katchafire, a New Zealand roots reggae band
Catching Fire (disambiguation)